Anta Sports Products Limited is a Chinese sports equipment multinational corporation headquartered in Jinjiang. It is the world's largest purely sports equipment company by revenue and third-largest manufacturer of sporting goods overall, behind Nike and Adidas.

Founded in 1994, its operations involve the business of designing, developing, manufacturing and marketing products, including sportswear, footwear, apparel and accessories under its own brand name. After completing the acquisition of Amer Sports, the company expanded in branding and owns more than 25 sporting apparel and equipment brands, including Arc'teryx, Salomon, and Wilson.

History 
Anta was founded by Ding Shizhong in 1991. In 2008, the Beijing Olympics gave Anta the opportunity to expand its business marketing footwear.

In 2009, the company acquired the Fila trademark in mainland China, Hong Kong and Macao from Belle International. Since then, the company operates the Fila business in these three areas. The company also operates DESCENTE and SPRANDI stores in China, as well as KOLON SPORT and KINGKOW stores in China, Hong Kong and Macao. Former Minnesota Timberwolves forward Kevin Garnett left his former shoe sponsor Adidas and has been sponsored by Anta since August 2010. Golden State Warriors guard Klay Thompson also left his Nike sponsor and has been signed with Anta since 2017. Klay Thompson's new contract with Anta will run through 2026 and could pay him up to $80 million. In December 2018 an investor consortium consisting of ANTA Sports, FountainVest Partners, Anamered Investments and Tencent announced a voluntary recommended public cash tender offer for all issued and outstanding shares in Amer Sports Corporation.

Anta Sports began a boycott of the NBA in October 2019 as a result of a re-tweet by a Houston Rockets' official in support of the Hong Kong protests. That ended however and, on 14 May 2020, Wilson Sporting Goods announced it would replace Berkshire Hathaway-owned Spalding as the NBA's official ball supplier as of the 2021-22 NBA season.

Controversy
During the 2022 Russian invasion of Ukraine, Anta refused to join the international community and withdraw from the Russian market. Research from Yale University published on August 10, 2022 identifying how companies were reacting to Russia's invasion identified Anta in the worst category of "Digging in", companies defying demands for exit/reduction of activities.

Sponsorships 
Anta Sports is the official supplier and sponsor of numerous teams, players, and associations.
Basketball

  Alex Caruso
  Kevon Looney
  Klay Thompson
  Gordon Hayward
  Jacob Evans
  Hamidou Diallo
  Rajon Rondo
  Luis Scola
  James Wiseman

College teams
  Adamson Soaring Falcons
  UST Growling Tigers
Boxing
  Manny Pacquiao
Formerly
 Chandler Parsons
 Kevin Garnett
 Danny Seigle

ANTA is the official supplier of the International Olympic Committee, sponsored 26 Chinese national teams in winter sports, boxing, taekwondo, gymnastics, weightlifting, wrestling, judo, surfing, water polo and golf.

References

External links
 
 

Companies listed on the Hong Kong Stock Exchange
Sporting goods manufacturers of China
Chinese companies established in 1994
Companies based in Fujian
Chinese brands
Shoe brands
Sportswear brands
Shoe companies of China
Multinational companies headquartered in China